Events in the year 1710 in Japan.

Incumbents
Monarch: Nakamikado

Deaths
January 16 - Emperor Higashiyama (b. 1675)

References

 
1710s in Japan
Japan
Years of the 18th century in Japan